Dear Yelena Sergeyevna is a 1988 Soviet drama film directed by Eldar Ryazanov. The film is based on an eponymous play by Lyudmila Razumovskaya.

Plot
…After the final exams at a regular school, three schoolchildren understand that they have not passed the exams, and it can break their future career. Fraudulently the teenagers enter the house of their teacher Yelena Sergeevna and demand the key to the safe in which the examination papers are stored. At first, schoolchildren try to persuade Yelena Sergeevna, then they come to bribery and blackmail. But the high-minded teacher does not agree to the deal with her conscience and tries to explain to her schoolchildren all the meanness and baseness of their actions ...

Cast
 Marina Neyolova - Yelena Sergeevna, teacher
 Natalia Shchukina - Lyalya, Yelena Sergeevna's schoolgirl 
 Dmitry Maryanov - Pasha, Yelena Sergeevna's schoolboy (voice - Andrey Tashkov)
 Fedor Dunaevsky - Vityok, Yelena Sergeevna's schoolboy
 Andrey Tikhomirnov - Volodya, Yelena Sergeevna's schoolboy (voice - Oleg Menshikov)
 Eldar Ryazanov - Yelena Sergeevna's neighbour

References

External links
 

1988 films
Soviet teen films